The Battle of Pistoria was fought early January 62 BC between the forces of the Roman Republic and Catiline, a senatorial conspirator who had been organising an attempted conspiracy against the consuls the previous year.

After his conspiracy was uncovered in early November 63 BC and he was denounced by Cicero he withdrew from Rome and went north into Etruria to join forces with his man there, Gaius Manlius. After arriving there, Catiline took up magisterial insignia; he and Manlius were declared hostes by the Senate. It also assigned Gaius Antonius Hybrida – co-consul with Cicero for 63 BC – to lead an army against the insurrectionists. Antonius' campaign continued into the new year and he was prorogued as proconsul. 

After word of the conspiracy's collapse with the death of its leaders in Rome, Catiline tried to escape for Transalpine Gaul but was blocked by three legions under Quintus Caecilius Metellus Celer. With his escape route to Gaul blocked, he withdrew south from the Apennine passes and toward Antonius' encamped at Faesulae. When Antonius was reinforced by a detachment led by Publius Sestius in the last days of December, he moved out to engage the Catilinarians, engaging them probably in the first days of January.

By the time of the battle, Catiline's army had dwindled to somewhere north of three thousand. The strength of Antonius' forces is unclear but  On the day of the battle, Antonius was afflicted with gout and passed command to his legate, Marcus Petreius. Catiline's forces initially held, but Petreius summoned his praetorian cohort and broke the Catilinarian centre, routing Catiline's army. Catiline was found dead in the midst of his enemy far forward from his line of the battle.

References 
 Citations

 Sources

External links 
 

62 BC
60s BC conflicts
1st-century BC battles
1st century BC in the Roman Republic
Pistoria 62 BC
Catiline